Acaster Selby is a village in the Selby District of North Yorkshire, England. It is part of the joint civil parish with Appleton Roebuck (where the population is now included).

History

The name is derived from the Latin word for a camp, 'castra', indicating that the Roman army may once have been based near here. There is no longer any signs of such an encampment which was thought to have provided protection of the waterway to Tadcaster. The use of Selby indicates that the lands were brought within the control of Selby Abbey. This was done by Osbert de Arches at the time of the Norman Conquest and confirmed in the reign of Richard I.

The village is listed in the Domesday Book as Acastre in the wapentake of Ainsty in the West Riding of Yorkshire, having 11 households under the lordship of Wulstan, who was replaced by Robert Malet in 1086.

College Farm at Acaster Selby is named after a former college, or a chantry, which was dissolved during the reign of Henry VIII. The site of the St Andrew's College,  to the north-east of the farm, is a scheduled monument and includes extensive earthworks of buildings and a moated enclosure.

Geography

Demography

According to the 1881 census the population was 115. The 2001 census showed a population of 56 in 20 households.

Governance

The Parish is part of joint Parish with Appleton Roebuck and has one seat on its council. It is part of the Selby & Ainsty constituency. It is part of the Appleton Roebuck Ward of Selby District Council. In turn it is part of the Escrick Electoral District of North Yorkshire County Council.

Religion

The village church of St John the Evangelist dates from 1850. It lies to the south of the village just off Back Lane. It is a Grade II Listed Building.

Gallery

References

External links
 
 

Villages in North Yorkshire
Civil parishes in North Yorkshire
Selby District